At the time of its merger with Kingfisher Airlines on 29 August 2008, Indian domestic airline Simplifly Deccan flew to the following 52 destinations in India:

References

Lists of airline destinations